Gary A. Tanaka (born June 23, 1943, in Hunt, Idaho) is an American businessman, sportsman and philanthropist who co-founded the investment company Amerindo Investment Advisors in 1979 along with Alberto Vilar.

Early life and education 
Tanaka was born during World War II in the Minidoka Internment Camp in Idaho during the period of Japanese internment. He graduated from MIT, then earned a PhD degree at Imperial College London in the United Kingdom with a dissertation on the mathematics of the transition from laminar to turbulent flow in a fluid flowing over a solid surface.

Personal life 
Tanaka lives in London with his wife and two children in a house which was once Dwight D. Eisenhower's wartime headquarters. Tanaka has two adult sons, Mark Tanaka, who is also a fund manager, most recently of Sanno Point Capital Management and Michael Tanaka, a notable businessman based in the UK.

Philanthropy 
Tanaka was known for his donation of £27m to Imperial College, which resulted in construction of the Tanaka Building in 2004, designed by the international architecture, planning and design studio Foster and Partners. The building houses Imperial College Business School, and combines the business school's facilities with a new front entrance for the College. He was also known for the high-profile court case against him in 2008.

In August 2008, the Business School at Imperial College London was renamed from "Tanaka Business School" to "Imperial College Business School" both because the old name did not strongly emphasise its association with the College, and because Tanaka was found guilty of fraud the same year. The school's accommodation was subsequently named "the Tanaka Building". An alternative speculation is that the college changed the name of the school to distance itself from Tanaka's fraudulent activities.

Legal issues 
Tanaka was tried in 2008 in New York for a $20 million fraud against customers of the Amerindo investment company he ran with Alberto Vilar. In November 2008 he was found guilty of conspiracy, securities fraud and investment adviser fraud. Tanaka was sentenced to five years in jail in early 2010. The sentence was later extended to six years.

Thoroughbred horse racing 

Dr. Tanaka owns a significant thoroughbred racing stable. His horses have won major races in Europe, North America plus prestigious Asian events, notably the Hong Kong Mile and the Singapore Airlines International Cup. The success of his stable has come in large part from his ability to spot good quality thoroughbreds racing in other countries and bring them to the US where they can run for larger purses, thus raising their resale and stud value. Many races elsewhere are held on grass tracks, while US races are usually run on dirt. Not every horse can make the transition, but Dr. Tanaka and his trainers have been successful in many significant cases. Much more information about Tanaka's stable is available in the cover article of the March 29, 2008 issue of The Bloodhorse.

See also 
 Amerindo Investment Advisors

References 

1943 births
Living people
Alumni of Imperial College London
American businesspeople convicted of crimes
American people convicted of fraud
American philanthropists
American racehorse owners and breeders
American people of Japanese descent
Japanese-American internees
Massachusetts Institute of Technology alumni
People associated with Imperial College London
People from Jerome County, Idaho